How Not to Write a Play is a book written by Walter Kerr, one time chief theatre critic for the New York Times.

The first edition was published in 1955 by Simon & Schuster, four years after Kerr had begun work as a theater critic for the New York Herald Tribune.

His book is an examination of what Kerr perceived were various negative trends and flaws in playwriting. Kerr's tone is at various points jocular, learned and lucid, with humorous titles, clear prose and an evident wide knowledge of playwrights from the Greeks all the way to Arthur Miller and other playwrights of the mid 20th century.

Of moderate length (244 pages), the book takes on many themes and topics. Kerr offers insights both into the practice and finances of contemporary theatre, blaming the declining audience (declining even in 1955) on the poor and un-entertaining fare being put before the public by both commercial and institutional producers.

In particular, he blames decades of slavish imitation of Henrik Ibsen and Anton Chekhov, not only because their styles had become hackneyed and arthritic (Ibsen, himself, had abandoned "Ibsenism" after only a decade), but because they were created by and for an intelligentsia, and no thriving theatrical culture has ever been built that way, citing the case of William Shakespeare vs. the school of John Lyly, among others.

He asserts that plays will always be more successful if they are highly entertaining, and argues that that entertainment can be at once enjoyable and artistically sophisticated. He also calls for a return to verse, pointing out Christopher Fry as an example of a new and supple 20th-century theatrical verse style.

Above all, Kerr is an advocate for creating believable, active characters and putting them into interesting stories, even at the expense of clean structures in plays, overarching intellectual / political theses, or delicate dissections of neurasthenic and impotent personalities.

In light of Kerr's marriage to playwright Jean Collins Kerr, his musing on the ethics of a critic reviewing a wife's play inspired Ira Levin's play and movie Critic's Choice.

Non-fiction books about theatre
Works about playwrighting
1955 non-fiction books
Simon & Schuster books